Schizovalva ochnias is a moth of the family Gelechiidae. It was described by Edward Meyrick in 1913. It is found in South Africa.

The wingspan is 17–18 mm. The forewings are dark fuscous with a black streak along the basal fourth of the costa and a thick black streak on the fold from near the base to one-third, followed by some red-brownish suffusion. There is a rather elongate pointed black spot in the disc before the middle, and an irregular black spot beyond the middle, connected by some ochreous-white edging. An ochreous-whitish spot is found on the costa at four-fifths, where some very indistinct pale reddish-ochreous suffusion crosses the wing. The hindwings are grey.

References

Endemic moths of South Africa
Moths described in 1913
Schizovalva